Benjamin Varonian (born 15 June 1980 in Nice, France) is a French-Armenian Olympic gymnast.

Varonian won two gold medals in the parallel bars and team all-around at the 1998 European Junior Gymnastics Championships. He competed at the 2000 Summer Olympics and won an Olympic silver medal in the horizontal bar. Varonian and Éric Poujade both became the first ever French gymnasts to win Olympic medals in gymnastics in a non-boycotted olympics.

References

External links
databaseOlympics
Sports-Reference.com

1980 births
Living people
Sportspeople from Nice
French male artistic gymnasts
Olympic gymnasts of France
Gymnasts at the 2000 Summer Olympics
Olympic silver medalists for France
Olympic medalists in gymnastics
French people of Armenian descent
Medalists at the 2000 Summer Olympics